Guy Gavriel Kay (born November 7, 1954) is a Canadian writer of fantasy fiction. The majority of his novels take place in fictional settings that resemble real places during real historical periods, such as Constantinople during the reign of Justinian I or Spain during the time of El Cid. Kay has expressed a preference to avoid genre categorization of these works as historical fantasy. , Kay has published 15 novels and a book of poetry. , his fiction has been translated into at least 22 languages. Kay is also a qualified lawyer in Canada.

Biography
Kay was born in Weyburn, Saskatchewan, in 1954. He was raised and educated in Winnipeg, Manitoba, and received a bachelor's degree in philosophy from the University of Manitoba in 1975.

When Christopher Tolkien needed an assistant to edit his father J. R. R. Tolkien's unpublished work, he chose Kay, then a student of philosophy at the University of Manitoba, because of a family connection. Kay moved to Oxford in 1974 to assist Christopher in editing The Silmarillion.

He returned to Canada in 1975 to pursue a law degree at the University of Toronto, which he obtained in 1978; he was called to the bar of Ontario in 1981. Kay became principal writer and an associate producer for a Canadian Broadcasting Corporation radio series, The Scales of Justice, and continued as principal writer when the series transferred to television.

In 1984, Kay's first fantasy work, The Summer Tree, the first volume of The Fionavar Tapestry trilogy, was published.

Kay has stated concerns about the decline of individual privacy, the expectation of privacy, and also literary privacy. The latter primarily concerns the use of real individuals in works of fiction, such as Michael Cunningham having based The Hours on Virginia Woolf.

Bibliography

Novels
 The Fionavar Tapestry, a portal fantasy in which five travel from our Earth to "the first of all worlds"
 The Summer Tree (1984)
 The Wandering Fire (1986), winner of the 1987 Prix Aurora Award
 The Darkest Road (1986)
 Tigana (1990), taking place in a setting based on Renaissance Italy
 A Song for Arbonne (1992), inspired by the Albigensian Crusade in medieval Provence
 The Lions of Al-Rassan (1995), set in an analogue of medieval Spain
 The Sarantine Mosaic, inspired by the Byzantium of Justinian I
 Sailing to Sarantium (1998)
 Lord of Emperors (2000)
 The Last Light of the Sun (2004), inspired by the Viking invasions during the reign of Alfred the Great
 Ysabel (2007), a contemporary fantasy set in Provence, centering on a teenage boy and his encounters with characters from the distant past. Linked to his Fionavar Tapestry series.
 Under Heaven (April 27, 2010), inspired by the 8th century Tang Dynasty and the events leading up to the An Shi Rebellion
 River of Stars (April 2, 2013), taking place in the same setting as Under Heaven, based on the 12th century Song Dynasty and the events around the Jin-Song Wars and the transition from Northern Song to Southern Song
 Children of Earth and Sky (May 10, 2016), taking place in the same world as The Lions of Al-Rassan, The Sarantine Mosaic, and The Last Light of the Sun, and taking place in a world based on Italy, Istanbul and the Balkans in the 15th century
A Brightness Long Ago (May 14, 2019), prequel to Children of Earth and Sky
 All the Seas of the World (May 17, 2022), sequel to A Brightness Long Ago

Poetry
 Beyond This Dark House (2003), a collection

Awards and distinctions

Awards

 Kay won the 1985 Scales of Justice Award for best media treatment of a legal issue, Canadian Law Reform Commission, 1985, for "Second Time Around".
 The Wandering Fire won the 1987 Prix Aurora Award in the English category for best speculative fiction.
 Kay won the 1991 Aurora Award for Best Novel for Tigana.
 Kay was runner up for the White Pine Award in 2007 for Ysabel.
 Ysabel was the winner of the 2008 World Fantasy Award for Best Novel.
 Kay won the International Goliardos Award for his contributions of the international literature of the fantastic.
 Under Heaven won the Sunburst Award in 2011 and was longlisted for the IMPAC/Dublin Literary prize.
 Kay was appointed to the Order of Canada in 2014 "for his contributions to the field of speculative fiction as an internationally celebrated author".
Under Heaven won the 2015 Prix Elbakin in France.
River of Stars won the 2017 Prix Elbakin in France.
Under Heaven was named the best fantasy novel of the year by The American Library Association, and was the SF Book Club's Book of the Year.

Nominations

 Kay has been nominated several times for the Mythopoeic Fantasy Award for Adult Literature.
 Kay has been nominated four times for the World Fantasy Award, and won in 2008 for "'Ysabel'".
 Kay has been nominated multiple times for the Canadian Sunburst Award.

References

Further reading

External links 

 Bright Weavings – authorized website with some contributions by Kay
 Kay at publisher Penguin Books Canada

Interviews and lectures
 Interview at Boomtron.com
 
 Interview by Raymond H. Thompson at the Library of Rochester
 World Fantasy 2008 Podcast
 In May 2021, Kay delivered the eighth Tolkien Lecture at Pembroke College, Oxford.

1954 births
Canadian fantasy writers
Lawyers in Ontario
Living people
People from Weyburn
Writers from Saskatchewan
University of Manitoba alumni
University of Toronto alumni
Members of the Order of Canada
Jewish Canadian writers
World Fantasy Award-winning writers
University of Toronto Faculty of Law alumni
Canadian male novelists
20th-century Canadian novelists
21st-century Canadian novelists